Pierre-Alain Frau (born 15 April 1980) is a French former professional footballer. He played as a striker or winger for Sochaux (two spells), Lyon, Lens, Paris Saint-Germain, Lille, and Caen in France and for Al-Wakrah.

Career
Nicknamed PAF after his initials, Frau was born on 15 April 1980 in Montbéliard, France, where he became a young find of his hometown club FC Sochaux-Montbéliard, and it was there he got his first opportunity to play in the France national league.

After completing what would have been a prospective move to Lyon from Montbéliard, he found his playing time in the 2004–05 season hampered by the presence of other established frontmen like Sylvain Wiltord, Nilmar and later, John Carew. Realising that it was a World Cup year with a slim chance to catch the attention of national coach Raymond Domenech, Frau secured a half-season loan to RC Lens, but failed to make the cut to the final France squad. Frau was called up to the senior France squad by Raymond Domenech in August 2004 but did not make it off the bench. For the following season, RC Lens wanted to keep him in Lens, but Frau preferred a move to Paris Saint-Germain. The transfer fee was not disclosed, but Olympique Lyonnais priced the striker at £4 million.

On 1 January 2008, Frau signed a three-and-a-half year deal with Lille and was given the shirt number 17.

Frau is known as one of the more famous players at his hometown club FC Sochaux-Montbéliard.

Honors
Sochaux
 Coupe de la Ligue: 2003–04
 Ligue 2: 2000–01

Lyon
 Ligue 1: 2004–05
 Trophée des Champions: 2004, 2005

Lille
 Ligue 1: 2010–11
 Coupe de France: 2010–11

References

External links
 
 
 Profile and pictures of Frau 

1980 births
Living people
Sportspeople from Montbéliard
French footballers
Footballers from Bourgogne-Franche-Comté
Association football forwards
France under-21 international footballers
France youth international footballers
Ligue 1 players
Ligue 2 players
Qatar Stars League players
FC Sochaux-Montbéliard players
Olympique Lyonnais players
RC Lens players
Paris Saint-Germain F.C. players
Lille OSC players
Stade Malherbe Caen players
Al-Wakrah SC players
French expatriate footballers
French expatriate sportspeople in Qatar
Expatriate footballers in Qatar